Events during the year 1983 in Northern Ireland.

Incumbents
 Secretary of State - Jim Prior

Events
7 February - The airfield at Sydenham, Belfast, reopens to commercial flights as Belfast Harbour Airport.
23 May - The Bushmills Distillery in County Antrim celebrates its 375th anniversary.
30 May - The inaugural meeting of the New Ireland Forum takes place at Dublin Castle.
10 June - Gerry Adams of Sinn Féin is elected the new Member of Parliament for West Belfast.
25 September - Maze Prison escape: 38 prisoners, using guns, escape from HM Prison Maze in the largest prison escape in U.K. history; one guard dies of a heart attack and twenty others are injured. Nineteen of the prisoners are apprehended within three days.
21 November - Three elders are shot dead during a service in Darkley Pentecostal Church, County Armagh. The shooting is claimed by the Catholic Reaction Force.

Arts and literature
15 May - Charabanc Theatre Company's first production, Lay Up Your Ends, written by Martin Lynch with Marie Jones and other members of the company, is premiered at The Arts Theatre, Belfast.
9 November - Christina Reid's first play, Tea In A China Cup, is premiered at the Lyric Theatre, Belfast.
Bernard MacLaverty's novel Cal is published.

Sport

Football
Irish League
Winners: Linfield

Irish Cup
Winners: Glentoran 1 - 1, 2 - 1 Linfield

 Pat Jennings becomes the first footballer to play in 1,000 Football League matches.

Motorcycling
Robert Dunlop wins Newcomers 350cc Isle of Man TT race.

Births
17 January - Christopher Stalford, MLA (died 2022)
2 February - Bridget McKeever, international hockey player.
9 May - Alan Campbell, sculler.
17 June - Connie Fisher, actress and singer.
5 December - Samantha Lewthwaite, Islamic terrorist.

Deaths
20 April - Sarah Makem, traditional singer (born 1900).
4 July - John Bodkin Adams, general practitioner in Eastbourne cleared of murdering one of his patients (born 1899).
21 August - Francis Evans, British diplomat (born 1897).
21 September - F. S. L. Lyons, historian and academic (born 1923).
15 November - John Rea, hammered dulcimer player.
23 December - Colin Middleton, artist (born 1910).

See also
1983 in Scotland
1983 in Wales

References

 
Northern Ireland